József Tajti (Jászapáti, 8 October 1943) is a Hungarian footballer, currently coaches Nyíregyháza Spartacus FC.

References
 Ki kicsoda a magyar sportéletben? [Who's Who in the Hungarian Sports Life?], Volume 3 (S–Z). Szekszárd, Babits Kiadó, 1995, p 85, 

1943 births
Living people
People from Jászapáti
Hungarian footballers
Hungarian football managers
Association football defenders
Budapest Honvéd FC players
Kaposvári Rákóczi FC players
Fehérvár FC managers
Nemzeti Bajnokság I managers
Sportspeople from Jász-Nagykun-Szolnok County